David Ray Jones (born August 10, 1947) is a former American football wide receiver who played three seasons with the Cleveland Browns of the National Football League. He was drafted by the Cleveland Browns in the eleventh round of the 1969 NFL Draft. He played college football at Kansas State University and attended Sherman County High School in Goodland, Kansas.

References

External links
Just Sports Stats
College stats

Living people
1947 births
Players of American football from Kansas
American football wide receivers
Kansas State Wildcats football players
Cleveland Browns players
People from Goodland, Kansas